Edward Curnow (born 7 November 1989) is a professional Australian rules footballer, currently playing for the Carlton Football Club in the Australian Football League (AFL).

Early life
Curnow participated in the Auskick program at Geelong in Victoria, Australia. and played his junior football for Modewarre in the Bellarine Football League and school football for The Geelong College in the APS, before playing TAC Cup football for the Geelong Falcons until 2007, also representing Vic Country in the AFL Under 18 Championships. He was drafted to the AFL by the Adelaide Football Club with its third selection in the 2008 AFL Rookie Draft (#40 overall), however he did not play a senior game for the Crows. He spent the 2008 season playing with Glenelg, his allocated SANFL club, and was delisted by the Crows after one season.

AFL career
Curnow returned to Victoria, and signed up with Box Hill in the VFL in 2009. Curnow's 2009 season was solid, but his 2010 season was exceptional, and he was consistently Box Hill's best player. His season was cut short when he broke his leg in Round 13, missing the Hawks' last eight games; nevertheless, he had already polled enough votes to win the Box Hill best and fairest (the Col Austen Trophy), and he finished third in the J. J. Liston Trophy, after holding a comfortable lead at the time of his injury. Curnow played a total of 33 senior games for Box Hill during his two years at the club, and also played one representative game for the VFL.

Following his successful VFL season, Curnow was recruited back to the AFL by the Carlton Football Club with its first selection in the 2011 AFL Rookie Draft (No. 18 overall). He was given guernsey number 35. After impressing in the pre-season, Curnow became the club's nominated rookie, and he made his debut for the Blues in Round 1 of the 2011 season against Richmond at the MCG. He made a bright start to his career as one of Carlton's best players in the first six matches of the season, although the rest of his season suffered after a shoulder injury in Round 7.

Over the following years, and particularly under the coaching of Mick Malthouse between 2013 and mid-2015, Curnow made a name as a reliable tagger. Champion Data rated him to be the second best tagger in the league in 2013, and he finished fourth in the club's best and fairest that year, as well as in 2015. His roles in the midfield and as a utility began to diversify in late 2015 after Malthouse's departure from the club; and after being elevated to the club's leadership group, he had a break-out year as a two-way tagger in 2016, increasing his attacking output as well as continuing to be a dependable tagger.

Personal life
Curnow's younger brother Charlie is also a footballer at the Carlton Football Club, being drafted to the club in 2016.

Statistics
  Statistics are correct to the end of the 2021 season

|- style="background:#eaeaea;"
! scope="row" style="text-align:center" | 2011
|style="text-align:center;"|
| 35 || 12 || 3 || 1  || 117 || 98 || 215 || 47 || 55 || 0.3 || 0.1 || 9.8 || 8.2 || 17.9 || 3.9 || 4.6 || 0
|- 
! scope="row" style="text-align:center" | 2012
|style="text-align:center;"|
| 35 || 18 || 0 || 2 || 128 || 190 || 318 || 58 || 89 || 0.0 || 0.1 || 7.1 || 10.6 || 17.7 || 3.2 || 4.9 || 0
|- style="background:#eaeaea;"
! scope="row" style="text-align:center" | 2013
|style="text-align:center;"|
| 35 || 21 || 6 || 3 || 182 || 165 || 347  || 72 || 99 || 0.3 || 0.1 || 8.7 || 7.9 || 16.5 || 3.4 || 4.7 || 0
|- 
! scope="row" style="text-align:center" | 2014
|style="text-align:center;"|
| 35 || 15 || 2 || 3 || 163 || 156 || 319 || 60 || 74 || 0.1 || 0.2 || 10.9 || 10.4 || 21.3 || 4.0 || 4.9 || 0
|- style="background:#eaeaea;"
! scope="row" style="text-align:center" | 2015
|style="text-align:center;"|
| 35 || 22 || 0 || 3 || 216 || 262 || 478 || 75 || 98 || 0.0 || 0.1 || 9.8 || 11.9 || 21.7 || 3.4 || 4.5 || 0
|- 
! scope="row" style="text-align:center" | 2016
|style="text-align:center;"|
| 35 || 21 || 5 || 9 || 275 || 249 || 524 || 76 || 147 || 0.2 || 0.4 || 13.1 || 11.9 || 25.0 || 3.6 || 7.0 || 3
|- style="background:#eaeaea;"
! scope="row" style="text-align:center" | 2017
|style="text-align:center;"|
| 35 || 13 || 6 || 3 || 156 || 126 || 282 || 51 || 66 || 0.5 || 0.2 || 12.0 || 9.7 || 21.7 || 3.9 || 5.1 || 0
|- 
! scope="row" style="text-align:center" | 2018
|style="text-align:center;"|
| 35 || 21 || 5 || 6 || 266 || 268 || 534 || 81 || 138 || 0.2 || 0.3 || 12.7 || 12.8 || 25.4 || 3.9 || 6.6 || 4
|- style="background:#eaeaea;"
! scope="row" style="text-align:center" | 2019
|style="text-align:center;"|
| 35 || 22 || 9 || 8 || 267 || 229 || 496  || 84 || 112 || 0.4 || 0.4 || 12.1 || 10.4 || 22.5 || 3.8 || 5.1 || 5
|- 
! scope="row" style="text-align:center" | 2020
|style="text-align:center;"|
| 35 || 17 || 4 || 3 || 212 || 108 || 320 || 42 || 89 || 0.2 || 0.2 || 12.5 || 6.4 || 18.8 || 2.5 || 5.2 || 5
|- style="background:#eaeaea;"
! scope="row" style="text-align:center" | 2021
|style="text-align:center;"|
| 35 || 22 || 10 || 3 || 318 || 178 || 496 || 106 || 80 || 0.5 || 0.1 || 14.5 || 8.1 || 22.5 || 4.8 || 3.6 || 4
|- class="sortbottom"
! colspan=3| Career
! 204
! 50
! 44
! 2300
! 2029
! 4329
! 752
! 1046
! 0.2
! 0.2
! 11.2
! 9.9
! 21.2
! 3.6
! 5.1
! 21
|}

References

External links

Australian rules footballers from Victoria (Australia)
1989 births
Living people
Carlton Football Club players
Box Hill Football Club players
Glenelg Football Club players
Preston Football Club (VFA) players
Geelong Falcons players
People educated at Geelong College
Place of birth missing (living people)